Final league standings for the 1932-33 St. Louis Soccer League.

League standings

Top Goal Scorers

External links
St. Louis Soccer Leagues (RSSSF)
The Year in American Soccer - 1933

1932-33
1932–33 domestic association football leagues
1932–33 in American soccer
St Louis
St Louis